Lawrencia is a plant genus in the family Malvaceae. The genus is endemic to Australia.

Systematics 
Species include: 
Lawrencia berthae (F.Muell.) Melville - Showy Lawrencia 
Lawrencia buchananensis Lander
Lawrencia chrysoderma Lander 
Lawrencia cinerea Lander
Lawrencia densiflora (Baker f.) Melville
Lawrencia diffusa (Benth.) Melville
Lawrencia glomerata Hook. - Clustered Lawrencia
Lawrencia helmsii (F.Muell. & Tate) Lander - Dunna Dunna
Lawrencia incana (J.M.Black) Melville
Lawrencia repens (S.Moore) Melville
Lawrencia spicata Hook. - Salt Lawrencia
Lawrencia squamata Nees - Thorny Lawrencia
Lawrencia viridigrisea Lander

References

 
Endemic flora of Australia
Malvaceae genera